Zoran Primorac  (born 10 May 1969) is a retired male table tennis player from Croatia. He is a two-time winner of the World Cup and one of only three table tennis players to have competed at seven Olympic Games. His highest ITTF world ranking was number 2, in 1998.

Biography
Primorac was born in Zadar and started playing table tennis at the club STK "Bagat" in his home town. As a junior, he won seven medals at European championships. In 1985 he moved to the Zagreb club "Vjesnik", Caja Granada and UMMC Verkhnaya Pyshma. At the 1987 World Championship in New Delhi he won the silver medal together with Ilija Lupulesku, and repeated the success by winning the silver at the 1988 Summer Olympics in Seoul. Together with Lupulesku he also won the 1990 European Championship in Gothenburg.

Primorac competed for Croatia at the 1992 Summer Olympics in Barcelona where he reached last 16 in singles and doubles. He repeated the same at the 1996 Summer Olympics.  At the 2004 Summer Olympics he was eliminated in the third round. At 2008 Summer Olympics Primorac lost in the quarter-final of the men's singles event to Jörgen Persson.

Primorac, Belgian Jean-Michel Saive, and Swede Jörgen Persson are the first table tennis players to have competed at seven Olympics, having competed in all Games since the sport was introduced in 1988.

In 1993 he won a bronze medal in Men's singles at World Table Tennis Championships. He won silver medal in 1995 and bronze in 1999 at World Championships in Men's doubles event.

At the 1998 and 2000 European Championships Primorac won silver medal in men's singles. In 1998 final he lost against Vladimir Samsonov and in 2000 he lost against Peter Karlsson. At the 1992, 1994, 2002 and 2005 European Championship he won the bronze medal in men's singles. At the 2007 European Championship in Belgrade he won the silver medal in the team event with Croatia (with Roko Tošić, Andrej Gaćina and Tan Ruiwu).

At the Mediterranean Games in the men's singles event he won gold medal in 1987, silver in 1993 and 1997 and bronze in 1991. In the men's doubles event he won gold medals in 1987 and 1991, silver in 1993 and bronze in 1997.

He currently uses specially-designed equipment made by Butterfly Table Tennis. He uses the Timo Boll spirit blade, while using Tenergy 05 rubber on both sides of his racket.

In the TV comedy The Office, the character Dwight Schrute names Zoran Primorac as one of his heroes, but pronounces his name incorrectly.

In 2018, Primorac was elected Chair of the ITTF Athletes Commission.

Achievements

See also
List of athletes with the most appearances at Olympic Games
List of flag bearers for Croatia at the Olympics

References

External links
 
 Zoran Primorac 

1969 births
Living people
Croatian male table tennis players
Olympic table tennis players of Yugoslavia
Olympic table tennis players of Croatia
Table tennis players at the 1988 Summer Olympics
Table tennis players at the 1992 Summer Olympics
Table tennis players at the 1996 Summer Olympics
Table tennis players at the 2000 Summer Olympics
Table tennis players at the 2004 Summer Olympics
Table tennis players at the 2008 Summer Olympics
Table tennis players at the 2012 Summer Olympics
Olympic silver medalists for Yugoslavia
Sportspeople from Zadar
Olympic medalists in table tennis
Medalists at the 1988 Summer Olympics
Mediterranean Games silver medalists for Croatia
Mediterranean Games bronze medalists for Croatia
Competitors at the 1993 Mediterranean Games
Competitors at the 1997 Mediterranean Games
Mediterranean Games medalists in table tennis